Douglas Glover may refer to:
 Douglas Glover (politician) (1908–1982), British politician
 Douglas Glover (writer) (born 1948), Canadian writer